Bunnythorpe is a village in the Manawatū-Whanganui region of New Zealand's North Island,  north of the region's major city, Palmerston North. Dairy farms predominate the surrounding area but the community facilities include Bunnythorpe School, with a roll of about 80 pupils as of 2010 as well as a Rugby Football Club, Country Club and several manufacturing plants. The population was 686 in the 2018 census.

History
The North Island Main Trunk Railway passed over government owned land, which was subdivided and later became Bunnythorpe. The village takes its name from Henry Bunny, the Secretary-Treasurer of the Wellington Provincial Council, which functioned from 1853 to 1876.

On the other side of the rail line, the town of Mugby Junction was to be established. It was proposed in 1878, that the link between the North Island Main Trunk and the Napier line would be here. However plans changed and the junction was located at Palmerston North. The building of Mugby Junction never eventuated.

Bunnythorpe gave birth to the Glaxo company and its products. In 1904 Joseph Nathan and Sons founded a baby-food manufacturer which processed local milk into a baby food named Glaxo (sold in the 1930s under the slogan Glaxo builds bonny babies). , still visible on the main street of Bunnythorpe is the factory for drying and processing cows' milk into powder, with the original Glaxo logo clearly visible, but nothing to indicate the birthplace of a major multinational. Products were made in Bunnythorpe until 1973.  the building is commercially owned.

The Glaxo company became a major pharmaceutical manufacturer and after a series of mergers it became part of the United Kingdom's GlaxoSmithKline in 2000. In 1979 the Glaxo factory was transformed into the Pantha BMX manufacturing plant, which was the first BMX plant in New Zealand and also the home of the first BMX track.

The Bunnythorpe electrical substation was established in 1924, with the electricity transmitted from Mangahao Power Station stepped down to supply the Palmerston North Municipal Electricity Department and the Manawatu-Oroua Electric Power Board. It shortly afterwards became a major switching point, with transmission lines extending from Bunnythorpe to Napier-Hastings, Whanganui, and Masterton. Today, the substation is owned by national grid operator Transpower, and continues to be the main switching point for the lower-central North Island.

Geography
Bunnythorpe is about midway between the Manawatu region's main city of Palmerston North and its second largest settlement, Feilding. To the east of the village lies Ashhurst, and Kairanga sits to the west. Bunnythorpe is part of the Manawatu Plains and is on relatively flat land, with few rolling hills in surrounding farming properties. Several small streams run through the town: the Mangaone Stream and Jack's Creek run parallel towards the south-west through Palmerston North. Several smaller waterways merge with these streams, passing through Bunnythorpe's south.

Demographics

The population of Bunnythorpe was 684 in the 2018 New Zealand census, an increase of 9 (1.3%) since the 2013 census, and an increase of 39 (6.%) since the 2006 census. There were 342 males and 345 females, giving a sex ratio of 0.99 males per female. Ethnicities were 624 people  (91.2%) European/Pākehā, 120 (17.5%) Māori, 3 (0.4%) Pacific peoples, and 21 (3.1%) Asian (totals add to more than 100% since people could identify with multiple ethnicities). Of the total population, 141 people  (20.6%) were under 15 years old, 123 (18.0%) were 15–29, 333 (48.7%) were 30–64, and 90 (13.2%) were over 65.

Climate
Bunnythorpe has a very similar temperate climate to Palmerston North, but temperatures tend to be slightly lower in winter and can be significantly lower during the summer months of December to February. The average summer temperature is 20.6 C and the average temperature during the coldest months of June–August is 11.2 C.

Parks and recreation

Bunnythorpe is popular among younger children as it is a small community and regarded as quite safe. Children often spend weekends and spare time utilising the open access to the primary school's playgrounds and sporting fields. There is also a Rugby Football Club on Raymond St with clubrooms and this is the site of the ANZAC memorial Cenotaph. The Mangaone Stream bridge off Maple Street on Te Ngaio Road is also popular among the children, with eels and fresh water trout among the catch.

Transport

Road
The main access to Bunnythorpe comes via Railway Road from Palmerston North and Wellington in the south; Ashhurst-Bunnythorpe Road from Ashhurst, Woodville and Hawke’s Bay in the east; Kairanga Bunnythorpe Road from the west; and Campbell Road to the north, serving Feilding.

Air
Bunnythorpe is less than 10 minutes' drive from Palmerston North Airport in Milson, where regular flights to Auckland, Wellington, Hamilton, Christchurch and Nelson are available.

Rail
The North Island Main Trunk Railway runs through the centre of Bunnythorpe but trains no longer stop in the village, as the station was closed in 1985. Freight and passenger trains run from between Wellington and Auckland, though passengers must board these services in Palmerston North.

Bus
A service operates between Feilding and Palmerston North hourly, which stops in Bunnythorpe. The main stop in Palmerston North is Main Street which is also the main Palmerston North suburban bus terminus, where buses can be caught to other suburbs. Inter-City buses depart from Palmerston North.

Government

Local
Bunnythorpe until recently was part of the Manawatu District. In a quest to attract growth to the region, Manawatu District agreed to transfer a portion of its territory to Palmerston North City; Bunnythorpe was a part of this portion.

Central
Bunnythorpe is represented in the Rangitīkei electorate by Ian McKelvie of National.

Bunnythorpe is part of Te Tai Hauāuru Maori electorate.

Education

References

External links
 Manawatu related website with information on Bunnythorpe
 GlaxoSmithKline Website

Populated places in Manawatū-Whanganui
Suburbs of Palmerston North